St. Henry's Cathedral is a Roman Catholic cathedral in Helsinki, Finland, dedicated to Bishop Henrik, a 12th-century Roman Catholic Bishop of Turku, Finland. It is the Cathedral Church of the Catholic Diocese of Helsinki. In terms of membership, the cathedral is the largest in Finland with approximately 5,000 members.

The church was designed by architect Ernst Lohrmann. It was constructed between 1858 and 1860, primarily to serve Russian Catholics in the army, as well as Catholic merchants. Although it was finished in 1860, it was not consecrated until 1904. It became the Cathedral Church of Helsinki in 1955. The architecture of the church is Gothic Revival. Statues of Bishop Henrik, Saint Peter and Saint Paul decorate the exterior.

Gallery

See also
Catholic Church in Finland
Catholic Diocese of Helsinki
St. Mary's Church, Helsinki

References

External links 

Churches in Helsinki
Gothic Revival church buildings in Finland
Catholic Church in Finland
Ullanlinna
Roman Catholic cathedrals in Finland
1860 establishments in Finland
Churches completed in 1860
Ernst Lohrmann buildings
19th-century Roman Catholic church buildings in Finland